Local elections were held in  Santa Rosa, Laguna, on May 13, 2013, within the Philippine general election. The voters elected for the elective local posts in the city: the mayor, vice mayor, and ten councilors.

Overview
Incumbent Mayor Arlene B. Arcillas decided to run for reelection under Liberal Party. Her opponent is Alicia Lazaga, a nominee under PDP-Laban.

Mayor Arcillas' running mate is incumbent vice-mayor Arnel Gomez, who is also under Liberal Party. His opponents are former vice mayors Jose Catindig, Jr. and Manuel Alipon. Catindig also served as Mayor from 2005 to 2007.

Candidates

Administration's Ticket

Opposition's Ticket

Others

Results
The candidates for mayor and vice mayor with the highest number of votes wins the seat; they are voted separately, therefore, they may be of different parties when elected.

Mayoral and vice mayoral elections

Santa Rosa City

City Council Elections

Voters will elect ten (10) councilors to comprise the City Council or the Sangguniang Panlungsod. Candidates are voted separately so there are chances where winning candidates will have unequal number of votes and may come from different political parties. The ten candidates with the highest number of votes win the seats.

 
 
 
 
 
 
 
 
 
 
|-
|bgcolor=black colspan=5|

References

External links
Official website of the Commission on Elections
 Official website of National Movement for Free Elections (NAMFREL)
Official website of the Parish Pastoral Council for Responsible Voting (PPCRV)

2013 Philippine local elections
Elections in Santa Rosa, Laguna
2013 elections in Calabarzon